Robert Schmertz (November 15, 1926 – July 24, 1975)  was an American real estate developer and sports franchise owner.  He was owner or part-owner of two NBA franchises; the Portland Trail Blazers from 1970 through 1972, and the Boston Celtics from 1972 until 1975.  He also owned the New England Whalers of the World Hockey Association, and the New York Stars of the now-defunct World Football League.  Schmertz also founded Leisure Technology, a developer of retirement communities.

Biography
Born to a Jewish family, Schmertz attended Hackensack High School, where he played center on the school's basketball team. The school inducted him into its Sports Hall of Fame in 1973. In 1970, Schmertz along with his friends Larry Weinberg and Herman Sarkowsky paid $3.7MM to secure an NBA expansion team for Portland.

In 1975, Schmertz was indicted by a New Jersey grand jury on bribery charges  Schmertz pleaded innocent to the charges.  In July of that year, he suffered a stroke and died on July 24.  Leisure Technology would become a major developer of retirement communities, but would go bankrupt in 1991.

Prior to his death in New York City, Schmertz lived in Lakewood Township, New Jersey.

References

1926 births
1975 deaths
American real estate businesspeople
Boston Celtics owners
Hackensack High School alumni
Hartford Whalers executives
Jewish American sportspeople
Portland Trail Blazers executives
Portland Trail Blazers owners
National Basketball Association executives
National Basketball Association owners
People from Hackensack, New Jersey
World Football League executives
World Hockey Association executives
20th-century American businesspeople
Sportspeople from Lakewood Township, New Jersey